Nipawin Regional Park is located in the northwest corner of Nipawin, Saskatchewan. It is one of the main tourist attractions in the Nipawin area. Covering over three hundred acres, the park is open year round, with many activities to partake in during the summer and winter months. The park features many trails for hiking enthusiasts.

Fishing 
Nipawin Regional Park borders Tobin Lake, making it a fishing mecca. It attracts fishermen from across North America. Several record breaking fish have been caught in the waters bordering the park. Fish caught here include walleye, northern pike,
goldeye, perch, and sauger. Several prestigious tournaments are held at NRP including the Vanity Cup, the Great Northern Pike Festival, and Fish for Freedom.

Popular Activities 
The Evergreen Golf and Country Club is a popular segment of the park, attracting hundreds of golf enthusiasts every year. It is an eighteen hole, par 72 course with grass greens. It was once touted as one of the top one hundred golf courses in Canada. Evergreen also maintains their top five ranking in the province of Saskatchewan. There is also RV parks, a boat launch and a beach. 

A large playground is also one of the distinct features of the park.
Baseball diamonds, horseshoe pits, and volleyball nets can also be found. There are many kilometres of groomed cross-country skiing and snowmobile trails inside the park limits.

External links
Nipawin and District Regional Park website
Town of Nipawin

Nipawin No. 487, Saskatchewan
Parks in Saskatchewan